Kuhuf Tuhudiya  is a village in the District of Jabal al Akhdar in north-eastern Libya. It is located about 13 km southeast of Bayda.

References

External links
Satellite map at Maplandia.com

Basic People's Congress divisions of Bayda
Populated places in Jabal al Akhdar